Ion Bălăceanu (25 January 1828 – 22 December 1914) was the Minister of Foreign Affairs from 30 January 1876 until 31 March 1876 during the existence of United Principalities. Bălăceanu is considered one of the most active foreign ministers who promoted closer alliances of Romania with Great Britain and France rather than with Germany and Russia.

References

1828 births
1914 deaths
Romanian Ministers of Foreign Affairs